The Continium or in full  Discovery Center Continium (sic)  is a  provincial science and industry based museum in Kerkrade, Limburg province in the Netherlands. It was formerly named Industrion.
The museum is an Anchor point on the European Route of Industrial Heritage.

References
Notes

Footnotes

External links

 Museum Website 

Museums in the Netherlands
Industry museums
European Route of Industrial Heritage Anchor Points